Canada Olympic Park (COP), formerly known as Paskapoo Ski Hill, is a ski hill and multi-purpose training and competition facility located in Calgary, Alberta, Canada, owned and operated by WinSport. It is currently used both for high performance athletic training and for recreational purposes by the general public. Canada Olympic Park was one of the venues for the 1988 Winter Olympics, being the primary venue for ski jumping, bobsleigh, and luge. 

The park is located in western Calgary, south of the Trans-Canada Highway, north of the community of Cougar Ridge and west of Bowness.

1988 Winter Olympics

The ski resort is one of the best-known legacies of the XV Olympic Winter Games which were held in Calgary in 1988. It was the main venue for bobsleigh, luge (both at the now bobsleigh, luge, and skeleton track), nordic combined, ski jumping, freestyle skiing (aerials and ballet).

Activities and facilities

In the winter, the park is also used for winter activities including downhill skiing, snowboarding, cross-country skiing, ski jumping, bobsleigh and luge. In the summer, the park is used for warm-weather activities including mountain biking, summer festivals, ski jumping training, zip-lining and summer camps. The park also has a number of indoor facilities which are operated year-round, including arenas, fitness centres, and an indoor ice track.

Skiing and Snowboarding

Canada Olympic Park is a popular place for people looking to go skiing or snowboarding without driving out to the mountains.  The hill is divided into three sections, the downhill racing section, the casual section and the terrain park.

The terrain park is of exceptional quality, and as of 2006, the halfpipe has been enlarged to be an exact replica of the halfpipe that was used for the 2010 Winter Olympics in Vancouver.  Other features of the terrain park include spines, handrail, and tables.

There are currently six lifts that are being used on a regular basis, two four-passenger detachable high-speed chairlift, one four person fixed grip quad, and four Magic Carpets. There is also a single chair that provides access to one of the smaller ski jumps, and a double chair (which has been removed), that takes people from the base area to near the base of the 90 m ski jump tower.

Snowmaking 
Canada Olympic Park relies almost exclusively on man made snow to create skiable terrain. Snowmaking usually begins in early December and depending on weather conditions usually ends in early February. The hill has an arsenal of snowmaking equipment including automated SMI PoleCat fan guns, 'Mckinney' stick guns, and a handful of aging SMI Highland fan guns. An onsight pump station provides high pressure water and air to hydrants located around the hill. When pumping at capacity the park consumes roughly 850,000 L/hr of water.

Ski jumping facility 
Winsport also operates a ski jumping facility on the east side of the Canada Olympic Park campus. The facility has six jumps ranging in size from K4 to K95. Of the six jumps at Canada Olympic park three are used year-round (the K18, K38, and K63). The K4 and the K89 jumps are used exclusively in the summer months. The largest jump, the K95 is no longer used for ski jumping and serves exclusively as a party venue. Collectively the facility sees on average 28,000 jumps each year. The majority of which are in the summer months. The Ski Jump venue is home of the Altius Nordic SC club.

Mountain Biking

In the summer Canada Olympic Park is open for the sport of mountain biking.  The high-speed chairlift is used with bike racks on the chairs.  There are numerous trails on the hill's west side, complete with north shore ladder stunts and singletrack trails.  The east trees just contain regular trails, with minimal stunts and jumps.  COP is also outfitted with a downhill course that holds competitions through the summer.  The trails are designed for all riding abilities.  Canada Olympic Park also has a large dirt jump park and trials park.  Summer sports camps run all summer with activities ranging from luge to ski jumping.

WinSport Arenas

In 2011, WinSport opened its ice facility that houses four ice rinks (an international ice size arena seating 3,000, three NHL-size rinks (the Joan Snyder arena, Arena C & the visitcalgary.com arena).  The arenas have been used for curling, figure skating, power skating (for long and short track speed skating), ringette, and hockey.  Also, the arena has hosted concerts, shows, and other sporting events.

During the summer of 2013, Hockey Canada held its Olympic orientation camp for prospective Canadian NHL athletes heading to the XXII Olympic Winter Games in Sochi.  Due to injury concerns and insurance disputes, drills and scrimmage sessions were held off ice in a "street hockey/ball hockey" format.

Markin MacPhail Centre
In 2014, WinSport completed the Markin MacPhail Centre. The centre is named after its benefactors Allan Markin and Keith MacPhail. The high-performance centre was designed as a training hub for Canadian athletes who have reached a provincial level of excellence. The center includes the ice arenas, a gymnasium, medical center for treatment and recovery, and an office tower whose residences include the National Sport School as well as several national sport federations.

Canada's Sports Hall of Fame

In October 28, 2008, Calgary was chosen, among nine Canadian cities, to permanently host Canada's Sports Hall of Fame (CSHOF). The foundation and construction of the new facility was laid on donated land by the former Calgary Olympic Development Association (CODA), now called the Canadian Winter Sport Institute or WinSport Canada. The cost of the project was C$50 million (about C$30 million was used to build the venue; another C$20 million for operating costs, through an endowment fund). It was opened to the general public on July 1, 2011, to coincide with the Canada Day festivities. The former Olympic Museum and Hall of Fame location was turned into a training site for athletes, making it (OMHoF) redundant and the CSHOF the only sports-related museum there.

Expansion plans

On June 11, 2012, City Hall councillors voted against WinSport Canada's multimillion-dollar proposal to have some land at COP's base made into a "sprawling retail centre" by a vote of 9–5. However, WinSport has an option of redeveloping the land into smaller projects, over time, which can be "sustainable."

See also

List of ski areas and resorts in Canada

References

External links
 WinSport Website
 Canada's Sports Hall of Fame Website

Parks in Calgary
Sports venues in Calgary
Venues of the 1988 Winter Olympics
Mountain biking venues in Canada
Ski areas and resorts in Alberta
Ski jumping venues in Canada
Olympic freestyle skiing venues
Olympic Nordic combined venues
Olympic ski jumping venues
Olympic Parks